Dibek is a village in the Nusaybin District of Mardin Province in Turkey. The village is populated by Assyrians and Kurds and had a population of 45 in 2021. The Kurdish population is Yazidi.

References 

Villages in Nusaybin District
Assyrian communities in Turkey
Kurdish settlements in Mardin Province
Yazidi villages in Turkey